The following is an incomplete list of recognized and non-recognized operations carried out by Israel's intelligence agency, Mossad, sorted in chronological order.

List 
 Nikita Khrushchev's speech capture (1956) - Mossad capture of a copy of the Nikita Khrushchev's speech denouncing Joseph Stalin. The Mossad passed it on to the United States, which published the speech, embarrassing the USSR.
 Operation Garibaldi (1960) - Mossad operation in Buenos Aires for the location, identification, kidnapping and later movement to Israel of senior Nazi fugitive Adolf Eichmann.
 Assassination of Herberts Cukurs (February 23, 1965) - Mossad operation in Montevideo in which the famous Latvian fugitive war criminal Herberts Cukurs was assassinated.
 Operation Diamond (1963–1966) - covert operation which began in mid – 1963, and ended on August 16, 1966, when the most advanced Russian war plane at that time, the Mig-21, was stolen from Iraq and landed at an air base in Israel.
 Wrath of God (began in 1972) - covert operation directed by Israeli government and Mossad to assassinate individuals alleged to have been directly or indirectly involved in the 1972 Munich massacre. Their targets usually included members of Black September and PLO. Most of the assassinations were carried out by bombings.
 Lillehammer affair (July 21, 1973) - mistaken killing of an Arab waiter in Lillehammer, Norway due to the Israeli agents mistaking their victim for Ali Hassan Salameh, the chief of operations for Black September. Most of the Mossad team was captured and tried for the murder, in a major blow to the intelligence agency's reputation.
 Operation Entebbe (4 July 1976) - intelligence gathering which contributed to the rescue of 102 hijacking hostages.
Assassination of Zuheir Mohsen (1979) - killing of as-Sa'iqa leader Zuheir Mohsen.
 Assassination of Yehia El-Mashad (June 13, 1980) - Mossad operation held in Paris, France, in which the Egyptian atomic scientist Yehia El-Mashad, who was involved in the development of the Iraqi nuclear reactor, was assassinated.
 Operation Opera also known as Operation Babylon (7 June 1981) - intelligence gathering on the progress of Iraq's Tuwaitha Nuclear reactor which led the Israeli air strike on it.
 Operation Moses (November 1984 – January 1985) - planning the evacuation of some 8,000 Ethiopian Jews to Israel. 
 Abduction of Mordechai Vanunu (1986) - Mossad operation to abduct and bring back to Israel Mordechai Vanunu, an Israeli nuclear technician who had fled Israel for the United Kingdom and revealed nuclear secrets. A female operative lured Vanunu to Rome, where Mossad agents drugged him and smuggled him to Israel, where he was tried and imprisoned for treason.
 Assassination of Gerald Bull (March 22, 1990) - shooting dead of Canadian scientist Gerald Bull while he was working on the Project Babylon Supergun for Saddam Hussein.
 Assassination of Atef Bseiso (June 8, 1992) - assassination of PLO head of intelligence Atef Bseiso.
 Assassination of Fathi Shaqaqi (October 26, 1995) - Mossad operation held in Sliema, Malta, in which Fathi Shaqaqi, the founder of the Islamic Jihad organization and the initiator of suicide bombings against Israel, was assassinated.
 Assassination attempt of Khaled Mashal (September 25, 1997) - a failed Mossad operation in which the institution attempted to assassinate the head of the Political Bureau of Hamas in Amman.
Assassination of Izz El-Deen Sheikh Khalil (September 26, 2004) - the killing of Hamas leader Izz El-Deen Sheikh Khalil in Damascus.
 Operation Orchard (September 6, 2007) - Successfully infiltrating Syria's nuclear reactor to gather evidence about the target, which led to the Israeli air strike on it.
Assassination of Imad Mughniyah (February 12, 2008) - the killing of Hezbollah leader Imad Mughniyah in Damascus.
Assassination of Muhammad Suleiman (August 1, 2008) - the alleged killing of Muhammad Suleiman, head of Syria's nuclear program, in Tartus.
Operation Olympic Games (2008-2010) - infiltration of Natanz Nuclear Facility and destruction of centrifuges using Stuxnet worm in joint operation with AIVD, CIA, DGSE and MI6.
Assassination of Mahmoud al-Mabhouh (January 19, 2010) - the alleged killing of Hamas operative Mahmoud al-Mabhouh in Dubai.
Assassination of Iranian nuclear scientists (2010-2012) - the alleged killing of Iranian nuclear scientists by The MEK operatives trained and armed by It.
Assassination of Muhammad Al-Zuari (December 15, 2016) - the alleged killing of Hamas operative Muhmmad Al-Zuari in Tunis.
Assassination of Fadi Mohammad al-Batsh (April 21, 2018) - the alleged killing of Hamas engineer Dr. Fadi al-Batsh in Kuala Lumpur.
Smuggling of Iranian nuclear archives.(2018)
Assassination of Aziz Asbar (August 5, 2018) - the alleged killing of senior Syrian scientist Aziz Asbar in Masyaf.
Arrest of Hussein Mahmoud Yassine (July 24, 2019) - arrest of a suspected undercover Hezbollah agent at Entebbe International Airport in a joint operation with ISO.
Tracking of Hassem Yussuf Zabib and Yasser Ahmed Tzahr (August 24, 2019) - tracking and targeted killing of two Hezbollah fighters in Lebanon in a joint operation with Aman and IDF.
Assassination of Abdullah Ahmed Abdullah (7 August 2020) - Al-Qaeda leader Abdullah Ahmed Abdullah was assassinated by two Israeli operatives on a motorcycle at the behest of the United States.
Fist Natanz explosion (2 July 2020) - the destruction of three quarters of the Natanz centrifuge assembly facility setting back Iran's nuclear program one to two years.
Assassination of Mohsen Fakhrizadeh (27 November 2020) - the assassination of Mohsen Fakhrizadeh using a 1 ton self-destructing gun.
Second Natanz explosion (11 April 2021) - an explosive device smuggled into Natanz facility causing an explosion that cut power to the facility.
Kidnapping attempt Palestinian computer experts (28 September 2022) - According to Malaysian authorities, an alleged Mossad cell consisting of at least 11 Malaysian operatives attempted to kidnap two Palestinian computer experts in Kuala Lumpur. Though they managed to kidnap one of the targets, the second man escaped and alerted Malaysian Police. The operatives subsequently assisted two Mossad agents via video call in interrogating the captive. Using the operatives' car registration plates, Malaysian Police were able to track down the operatives and rescue the kidnapping victim. According to Al Jazeera Arabic, a "well-informed Malaysian source" claimed that an investigation had uncovered an undercover Mossad cell in Malaysia that was involved in spying on important sites including airports, government electronic companies, and tracking down Palestinian activists. These Malaysian operatives were alleged to have received training in Europe.

See also
 List of Israeli assassinations
 List of the Israel Defense Forces operations

References

 
Mossad operations